Drusilla of Mauretania is a name sometimes used to refer to two women;
"Julia" (possibly named Drusilla), daughter of Juba II of Mauretania
Drusilla, daughter of Ptolemy of Mauretania